is a railway station in city of Nagakute, Aichi Prefecture, Japan operated by the Aichi Rapid Transit Company.

Lines

Layout
The station has one elevated island platform with the station building underneath. The station building has automated ticket machines, Manaca automated turnstiles and is staffed. The station is equipped with platform screen doors.

Platforms

Adjacent stations

Station history

Passenger statistics
In fiscal 2017, the station was used by 2,573 passengers daily.

Surrounding area
 Nagoya University of Commerce & Business

See also
 List of Railway Stations in Japan

References

External links

Linimo official home page

Railway stations in Japan opened in 2005
Railway stations in Aichi Prefecture
Nagakute, Aichi